Martin Westlake (born 1957) is a British and Belgian author (historical, science fiction and short stories in various genres), playwright, biographer, academic and a former high-ranking EU civil servant. He is married to Belgian artist Godelieve Vandamme.

Fiction 
Westlake's forthcoming full-length historical novel, Other Than an Aspen Be, set in the 1914-1918 period, portrays the scourge of war and the plight of refugees and the existential dilemmas these cause. Westlake is represented by Bill Goodall

Westlake has had more than twenty short stories published in various genres. His SF short stories have been published notably in Aphelion and Metaphorosis. His 2021 story, "Going Home", was selected for inclusion in the recently-published The Best of British Science Fiction 2021

A young adult SF novel, The Hunt, was published in 2016 under the pseudonym, Paul Bird. In an interview about the book, which features a young gamer in a futuristic world, Westlake/Bird cites various inspirations including art, literature, and the Bible.

Playwright 

Westlake's plays been performed in Brussels and elsewhere. His farce, The Impotence of Being Frank, was first performed at the Warehouse Theatre (Brussels) by the English Comedy Club (ECC) in May 2017. The comedy was reprised by the ECC at the Warehouse Theatre in May 2019, and taken to the Festival of European Anglophone Theatre Societies (FEATS) in Ottobrun (Munich), where it was performed at the Entity Theatre in June 2019. His Sons and Mothers, six monologues about "three mothers who have lost their sons and three sons who have lost their mothers", was performed by the Little Seal Company at the Warehouse Theatre in October 2019. Westlake was also an original cast member.

Collaborations 

Westlake has partnered Brussels-based composer Nigel Clarke (https://nigel-clarke.com/ ) in music/verse compositions. These have included 'Heritage Suite'/'What Hope Saw' (2009); 'Earthrise' (2010); 'Storm Surge' (2013); 'The City in the Sea]' (2013); 'Where a Scarlet Flower Will Blossom (2014); and 'Mysteries of the Horizon]' (2015). Westlake and Clarke are currently cooperating on a joint composition for the theatre, "The Experiment".

Biographer 
In 2001 Westlake published a full-length biography of British Labour politician, Neil Kinnock to critical acclaim: 'A biography as frank as this one reveals him as a man of equal courage and integrity.' - Mail on Sunday; 'Kinnock was a brave politician – and a thoroughly decent one. He is owed this biography.' - Financial Times; 'Westlake reminds us of Kinnock's pivotal historical importance.' - The Independent; 'This book is one of the
most sublimely constructed and factually complete literary gems of the year.' - The Independent on Sunday.

Westlake has since contributed chapters about various aspects of Kinnock's career to a number of edited publications. In 2017 he collaborated with the London Almeida Theatre's Figures of Speech series with an essay about Neil Kinnock's 1987 "A Thousand Generations" speech; A Thousand Generations — Figures of Speech (almeida.co.uk). He has contributed biographical essays to The Oxford Dictionary of National Biography, notably about former European Parliament Secretary-General, Sir Julian Priestley.

Academic Career 
Since 2013 Westlake has been a Visiting Professor at the College of Europe in Bruges, where he also sits on the Academic Council (https://www.coleurope.eu/whoswho/person/martin.westlake ). He runs a research seminar on the constitutional, institutional and political reform of the European Union and its institutions. Between 2000 and 2005 he taught a course at the College about the European Parliament. His former students include Roberta Metsola (née Tedesco), President of the European Parliament (2022 - ). Westlake is also a Visiting Professor at the European Institute of the London School of Economics and Political Science (LSE) (https://www.lse.ac.uk/european-
institute/people/westlake-martin ), where he co-organises and co-chairs, with Anthony Teasdale, a weekly seminar on 'The EU in Practice; Politics and Power in the British System';
https://www.lse.ac.uk/european-institute/the-european-union-in-practice

Major academic publications 
Westlake has published widely on the European institutions and British politics. His main books as
author or editor include:
Britain's Emerging Euro-Elite? The British in the Directly-Elected European Parliament, 1979–1992, Dartmouth Press, London, 1994
The European Commission and the European Parliament: Partners and Rivals in the European Policy-Making Process, Butterworth, 1994
A Modern Guide to the European Parliament, Pinter, London, 1994
British Politics and European Elections 1994, (with David Butler), Macmillan, London, 1995
The Council of the European Union, Cartermill International, London, 1995
The European Union Beyond Amsterdam: New Concepts of European Integration (ed), Routledge, London, 1998
The Council of the European Union (second edition), John Harper Press, London, 1999
Leaders of Transition (ed), Macmillan, London, 2000
British Politics and European Elections 1999, (with David Butler), Macmillan, London, 2000
Kinnock The Biography, Little Brown, London, October 2001
The Council of the European Union (third edition, with David Galloway), John Harper Press, London, 2004
British Politics and European Elections 2004 (with David Butler), Palgrave, London, 2005
The European Economic and Social Committee, John Harper Press, London, 2016
Slipping Loose: The UK's Long Drift Away From the European Union, Agenda Press, Newcastle, 2020
The European Union's New Foreign Policy (ed), Palgrave, London, 2020
Outside the EU: Options for Britain (ed), Agenda Press, Newcastle, 2020

Westlake has also published a large number of refereed articles, research and occasional papers,
chapters in edited volumes, blog pieces and book reviews.

In 2018, writing under the pseudonym Johannes de Berlaymont, Westlake published Working for the
EU: How to get in (2018) (https://www.johnharperpublishing.co.uk/working-for-the-eu-how-to-get-
in/ ), and has since run an eight-hour career workshop based on the book each autumn at the College
of Europe.

Journalism 
Westlake's occasional journalism has been published inter alia in the Times, the Guardian, the
Financial Times, the European Voice, the Bulletin and Travel Tomorrow
(https://traveltomorrow.com/author/mwestlake/ ).

Civil Service Career 
Starting in 1985, Westlake had a lengthy career in European organisations and the EU institutions, rising to become Secretary-General of the European Economic and Social Committee, 2008-2013 before taking early retirement. He began his career in the Council of Europe, working for the Parliamentary Assembly. Joining the European Union, he worked for the Council of the European Union, the European Commission (Secretariat General, DG X, DG Education and Culture) and the European Economic and Social Committee, where he worked first as Head of Communications and then as Director of Consultative Works before becoming Secretary-General. During his time in DG Education and Culture he played a key role in developing the Erasmus Mundus programme (now absorbed into Erasmus Plus), the EU's answer to the U.S. Fulbright Programme.

See also 
European Economic and Social Committee

References

External links 
EESC official website

Political office-holders of the European Union
Living people
1957 births
British officials of the European Union